Vidyut Dev Singh Jammwal (born 10 December 1980) is an Indian actor, martial artist and film producer who predominantly works in Hindi films. He is also a practitioner of Kalaripayattu. He is best known for his roles in Commando film series, and is recipient of several awards including one Filmfare Award.

He made his Telugu debut with Sakthi, Hindi with Force and Tamil debut with Billa II, all in negative roles. His first lead role was in the successful film Commando. He went onto appear in various films including Anjaan, Thuppakki, Baadshaho, Commando 2, Junglee, Yaara, Commando 3 and Sanak.

Early life
Vidyut Jammwal was born in Jammu, Jammu and Kashmir, India. He is one of three children born to an Army officer and lived in various parts of India (owing to his father's transferable job) and trained in Kalaripayattu in an ashram in Palakkad, Kerala which was run by his mother, since he was three years old. He traveled to many countries training with martial artists in various forms, some of which find their base in Kalaripayattu. Jammwal travelled to over 25 countries, where he performed in live action shows.

Career

Debut, modelling  and recognition (2011-12)
Jammwal made his Bollywood debut with the John Abraham starrer 2011 film Force, a remake of the Tamil-language film Kaakha Kaakha. He played a negative role in the film and won multiple best debut awards including the Filmfare Award for Best Male Debut. 

2011 witnessed Jammwal featuring in negative roles in the Telugu-language films Shakti and Oosaravelli, both starring NTR. In 2012, Jammwal made his debut in Tamil cinema with Billa II, as the antagonist opposite Ajith Kumar which earned him critical appreciation. The same year, he played the antagonist in Thuppakki opposite actor Vijay, which became a blockbuster. He also received a SIIMA Award for Best Actor in a Negative Role for the film.

Turning point in acting career and success (2013-present)
Jammwal later acted in Hindi-language film Commando as a protagonist and performing real-world combat-based action without the aid of stuntmen. The film was showcased internationally for the first time in July 2013 at the Fantasia Film Fest in Montreal, followed by a screening at the Fantastic Fest in Texas in September 2013. He received positive feedback from international media and action directors, calling him India's answer to Bruce Lee and Tony Jaa. After the success of Commando, he played a sharpshooter cop in Tigmanshu Dhulia's Bullett Raja. In 2014, he played a supporting role in the Tamil-language film Anjaan, alongside Suriya. In 2017, he starred in Commando 2, the sequel to Commando, which became a box office success. Baadshaho was his next release that year in which he played Major Seher Singh, the movie did average business worldwide.

In 2019, Jammwal starred in American director Chuck Russell's first Bollywood film Junglee and Commando 3. The latter saw him returning to the Commando series and became the most successful film in the franchise. His next project was Tigmanshu Dhulia's Yaara, an official remake of the French film Les Lyonnais. Yaara was one of three films Vidyut signed for – the other two being large format films by director Ram Madhvani, creating an aura similar to the Hollywood flick 300. In 2020, he appeared in an action thriller Khuda Haafiz which was inspired from real life events. The movie became his biggest opener ever and its sequel Khuda Haafiz Chapter II was announced with same leads. He also played the lead role in the movie Sanak.

In the media

Jammwal has also been part of a number of popular magazine lists. He ranked in The Times of India's listing of India's Top 10 Most Desirable Men in 2012 and 2013. Men's Health declared him as List of Best Bodies and Top 5 Fittest Men in 2011 and 2012 respectively. In 2012, People Magazine India listed him in as one of The Sexiest Men Alive. In 2014, He was honoured as PETA's Hottest Vegetarian along with Kangana Ranaut. In 2018, he was declared as "Top 6 Martial Artists Around The World".

Personal life
Jammwal is a veganand a rock climber.

On 1 September 2021, Vidyut Jamwal announced his engagement with fashion designer Nandita Mahtani.

Filmography

Films 

 All films are in Hindi, unless otherwise noted.

Television

Music videos

Awards and nominations

See also
 List of vegans
 List of martial arts
 List of Bollywood actors

References

External links

 
 

Dogra
1980 births
Dogra people
Living people
21st-century Indian male actors
Indian male film actors
Indian male martial artists
Indian stunt performers
Kalarippayattu practitioners
Male actors from Jammu and Kashmir
Male actors in Hindi cinema
Male actors in Tamil cinema
Male actors in Telugu cinema
People from Jammu (city)
Filmfare Awards winners
International Indian Film Academy Awards winners